Jim Matt (born January 18, 1964) is a country music singer. Matt was signed to Little Dog Records in 1993 and released his album All My Wild Oats in 1995. The album was also released in the United States on Mercury Records. The album produced three chart singles on the Canadian RPM country charts; however, no singles charted in the United States.

He is currently based in Sudbury, Ontario, where he married jazz singer Sarah Craig in July 2011. The evening before their actual wedding, the couple put together The Wedding Rehearsal, a show at the Sudbury Theatre Centre which featured performances by Matt, Craig and several other local musicians.

Discography

Albums

Singles

References

1964 births
Living people
Canadian country singers
Canadian male singers
Musicians from Greater Sudbury
People from Timiskaming District